J. R. R. Tolkien created a dilemma for himself with his supposedly evil Middle-earth peoples like Orcs when he made them able to speak. This meant they were sentient and open to morality, like Men.  In Tolkien's Christian framework, that in turn meant they must have souls, so killing them would be wrong without very good reason. If he wanted killing them not to be such a problem, then they had to be non-sentient and without any moral sense, like ordinary animals. Both Tolkien and other scholars have been aware of the contradiction implied by this position: if Orcs were essentially "beasts", then they should not have had a moral sense; if they were corrupted Elves, then treating them as "other" to be slaughtered was straightforward racism. Tolkien made repeated attempts to resolve the dilemma.

Context 

J. R. R. Tolkien was an English author and philologist of ancient Germanic languages, specialising in Old English; he spent much of his career as a professor at the University of Oxford. He is best known for his novels about his invented Middle-earth, The Hobbit and The Lord of the Rings, and for the posthumously published The Silmarillion which provides a more mythical narrative about earlier ages. He invented several peoples for Middle-earth, including Elves, Dwarves, Hobbits, Orcs, Trolls, Ents, and Eagles. A devout Roman Catholic, he described The Lord of the Rings as "a fundamentally religious and Catholic work", rich in Christian symbolism.

Sentience and implied morality 

In the cosmology of Tolkien's legendarium, Men live only in the world (Arda), are able to die from it, have souls, and may ultimately go to Heaven, though this is left vague in the Legendarium. The Tolkien scholar Tom Shippey notes that in the Middle English source, the South English Legendary from c. 1250, which he presumes Tolkien must have read, Elves appear on Earth and in the Earthly Paradise, leaving a puzzle as to whether they had souls. Since they could not leave the world, the answer was no; but given that they did not disappear completely on death, the answer had to have been yes. In The Silmarillion, Tolkien similarly has the Elves go not to Heaven but to the halfway house of the Halls of Mandos on Valinor.

A different problem arises especially with apparently wholly evil beings, especially Orcs, but it applies also to others such as Wargs and Trolls. Since evil cannot make, only mock, Orcs cannot have an equal and opposite morality to that of Men; but since they speak and have a moral sense (though they are unable to keep to it), they cannot be described as wholly evil or lacking sentience. All of this implies, as various scholars have commented, a hierarchy of races comparable with the medieval great chain of being, representing a range of sentience and associated moral complexity from Men – unquestionably sentient and subject to moral judgement – down to mere beasts, which are free of morality. In between, however, are several peoples which at least sometimes have the power of speech, but which Tolkien implies are wholly evil and without morality, raising questions about what that could mean.

Wargs, great wolf-like beasts, can attack independently, as they do while the Fellowship of the Ring is going south from Rivendell, and soon after Thorin's Company emerged from the Misty Mountains. The group of Wargs in The Hobbit could speak, though never pleasantly. The critic Gregory Hartley notes that Tolkien uses several types of anthropomorphized animals, such as the sentient eagles, giant spiders, Smaug the dragon, ravens and thrushes. Hartley states that the Wargs on the other hand do not rise above the level of beasts, as they do not "speak the language of humans; they do not act independently; they do not possess autonomous wills or build civilizations. He notes on the other hand that Tolkien writes about Wargs' actions using verbs like "[to] plan" and "[to] guard", implying in his view that the Wargs are monstrous, "more than mere beasts".

Tolkien faced the question of the Great Eagles' nature with apparent hesitation. In early writings there was no need to define it precisely, since he imagined that, beside the Valar, "many lesser spirits... both great and small" had entered Eä upon its creation; and such sapient creatures as the Eagles or Huan the Hound, in Tolkien's own words, "have been rather lightly adopted from less 'serious' mythologies". The phrase "spirits in the shape of hawks and eagles" in The Silmarillion derives from that stage of writing. After completing The Lord of the Rings, Tolkien moved toward a more carefully defined "system" of creatures. At the top were incarnates or "Children of Ilúvatar": Elves and Men, those who possessed fëar or souls, with the defining characteristic of being able to speak; next were self-incarnates, the Valar and Maiar, "angelic" spirits that "arrayed" themselves in bodily forms of the incarnates or of animals, and were able to communicate both by thought and speech; and finally animals, mere beasts, unable to speak. For some time Tolkien considered the Eagles as bird-shaped Maiar. However, he had already said in The Lord of the Rings that Gwaihir and Landroval were descended from the Eagle Thorondor, so no supernatural origin was involved. Tolkien had also, long before then, rejected the notion of their being "Children" of the Valar and Maiar. In the last of his notes on this topic, dated by his son Christopher to the late 1950s, Tolkien decided that the Great Eagles were animals that had been "taught language by the Valar, and raised to a higher level—but they still had no fëar [souls]."

The Tolkien scholars Paul Kocher and Shippey note that in The Hobbit, the narrator provides a firm moral framework, with good elves, evil goblins (Orcs), and the other peoples like Dwarves and Eagles somewhere in between. The narrator says that the Eagles are "not kindly birds", and clearly carnivorous enough to eat a small rabbit-like Hobbit.

Dilemma 

Orcs are depicted as wholly evil, meaning that they could be slaughtered without regret. All the same, Orcs are human-like in being able to speak, and in having a similar concept of good and evil, a moral sense of fairness, even if they are not able to apply their morals to themselves. This presented Tolkien, a devout Roman Catholic, with a problem: since "evil cannot make, only mock", the at least somewhat sentient and morally-aware Orcs could not have been created by evil as a genuinely new and separate species; but the alternative, that they were corrupted from one of Middle-earth's free peoples, such as Elves, which would imply that they were fully sentient and had immortal souls, was equally unpalatable to him. Tolkien realized that some of the decisions he had made in his 1937 children's book The Hobbit, showing his goblins (Orcs) as even slightly civilised, and giving his animals the power of speech, clearly implied sentience; this conflicted with the more measured theology behind his Legendarium.

Shippey writes that the Orcs in The Lord of the Rings were almost certainly created just to equip Middle-earth with "a continual supply of enemies over whom one need feel no compunction", or in Tolkien's words from "Beowulf: The Monsters and the Critics", "the infantry of the old war", ready to be slaughtered. Shippey states that all the same, orcs share the human concept of good and evil, with a familiar sense of morality, though he comments that, like many people, Orcs are quite unable to apply their morals to themselves. He notes that in The Two Towers, Tolkien has the Orc Gorbag disapprove of the "regular elvish trick" of seeming to abandon a comrade, as he wrongly supposes Sam has done with Frodo. Shippey describes the implied view of evil as Boethian, that evil is the absence of good; he notes however that Tolkien did not agree with that point of view, believing that evil had to be actively combatted, with war if necessary, the Manichean position.

In a 1954 letter, Tolkien wrote that Orcs were "fundamentally a race of 'rational incarnate' creatures, though horribly corrupted, if no more so than many Men to be met today." Robert T. Tally wrote in Mythlore that despite the uniform presentation of orcs as "loathsome, ugly, cruel, feared, and especially terminable", "Tolkien could not resist the urge to flesh out and 'humanize' these inhuman creatures from time to time", in the process giving them their own morality. 

Tolkien attempted to resolve the dilemma about his Orcs by proposing several semi-contradictory theories for their origins. In The Tale of Tinúviel, Orcs originate as "foul broodlings of Melkor who fared abroad doing his evil work". In The Silmarillion, Orcs are East Elves (Avari) "corrupted and enslaved", tortured, and bred by Melkor "in envy and mockery of the Elves"; the Elves of the West thought them "perhaps to be Avari who had become evil and savage in the wild; in which they guessed all too near, it is said." They bred like Elves and Men: "For the Orcs had life and multiplied after the manner of the Children of Ilúvatar". In "The Fall of Gondolin" Morgoth made them of slime by sorcery, "bred from the heats and slimes of the earth". Or, they were "beasts of humanized shape", possibly, Tolkien wrote, Elves mated with beasts, and later Men. Or again, Tolkien suggested, they could have been fallen Maiar, perhaps a kind called Boldog, like lesser Balrogs; or corrupted Men. If they were just "beasts" then they should not have had any morality of their own; but if they were fallen Elves or Maiar, then they certainly did, and valuing them as "other", to be killed without mercy, would in the opinion of Tolkien scholars like R. T. Tally be straightforward racism.

References

Primary
This list identifies each item's location in Tolkien's writings.

Secondary

Sources  

 
  
     
 
 
 
  
       
         
       
         
  
       
      
       
         
       

Themes of The Lord of the Rings
Tolkien studies
Orcs